Acacia trudgeniana  (common name - Trudgen's wattle) is a shrub of the genus Acacia and the subgenus Phyllodineae. It is native to a small area in the  Gascoyne and Pilbara regions of Western Australia.

Taxonomy
It was first described by Bruce Maslin in 2008, and was named for Malcolm Trudgen, who first drew Maslin's attention to its existence.

See also
List of Acacia species

References

trudgeniana
Acacias of Western Australia
Taxa named by Bruce Maslin